Didier Lockwood (11 February 1956 – 18 February 2018) was a French violinist. He played in the French rock band Magma in the 1970s, and was known for his use of electric amplification and his experimentation with different sounds on the electric violin.

Career
In 1979, Lockwood released his first album as a leader, New World, and recorded more than 20 albums. In 1994, he moved to New York City for two years. During that time he recorded two albums, New York Rendez Vous and Storyboard. Lockwood's influences include violinist Jean-Luc Ponty. He started playing electric violin after hearing Ponty on the album King Kong: Jean-Luc Ponty Plays the Music of Frank Zappa. Another important influence was Frenchman Stéphane Grappelli. In 2000, Lockwood recorded a tribute album to Grappelli.

Discography

In Magma
 Live/Hhaï (1975)
 Üdü_Ẁüdü (1976)

As leader
 Thank You Friends with Francois Cahen (Atlantic, 1978)
 New World (MPS, 1979)
 Surya (Inner City, 1980)
 Live in Montreux (Pausa, 1980)
 Fusion (JMS, 1981)
 Fasten Seat Belts (JMS, 1982)
 Trio (JMS, 1983)
 The Kid (MPS, 1983)
 Out of the Blue (Gramavision, 1985)
 Rhythm & BLU (Gramavision, 1986)
 Absolutely Live (JMS, 1986)
 1.2.3.4 (JMS, 1987)
 Au Clair de La Lune (JMS, 1989)
 Lune Froide (JMS, 1991)
 Colors (Nuevos Medios, 1991)
 Caron/Ecay/Lockwood (JMS, 1992)
 For Evans Sake (JMS, 1992)
 Solal Lockwood (JMS, 1993)
 Onztet de Violon Jazz (JMS, 1994)
 New York Rendez-Vous (JMS, 1995)
 Storyboard (Dreyfus, 1996)
 Round About Silence (Dreyfus, 1998)
 Omkara (Dreyfus, 2001)
 Globe Trotter (Universal, 2003)
 Les Mouettes (EmArcy, 2005)
 Tribute to Stephane Grappelli (Dreyfus, 2006)
 Le Jazz & La Diva (Ames/Harmonia Mundi 2006)
 Waltz Club (EmArcy, 2006)
 La Reine Soleil (Ames, 2007)
 For Stephane (Ames, 2008)
 Le Jazz & La Diva Opus II (Ames, 2008)
 Brothers (Ames, 2009)
 Apesantar (Fremeaux, 2016)
 Open Doors (Ames/Okeh/Sony, 2017)

Gallery

References

External links
 Official website
 
 

1956 births
2018 deaths
People from Calais
French jazz violinists
21st-century French male violinists
Magma (band) members
French male jazz musicians
Gramavision Records artists
20th-century French male violinists